The 2018–19 season is Scunthorpe United's 120th season in their existence and their fifth consecutive season in League One. Along with competing in League One, the club will also participate in the FA Cup, EFL Cup and EFL Trophy. The season covers the period from 1 July 2018 to 30 June 2019.

Squad

Statistics

|-
!colspan=14|Players out on loan:

|-
!colspan=14|Players that left the club during the season:

|}

Goals record

Disciplinary record

Competitions

Pre-season friendlies
The Iron revealed pre-season fixtures against Winterton Rangers, Alfreton Town, SV Seekirchen, SV Wals-Grünau, Nottingham Forest and Lincoln City.

League One

League table

Results summary

Results by matchday

Matches
On 21 June 2018, the League One fixtures for the forthcoming season were announced.

FA Cup

The first round draw was made live on BBC by Dennis Wise and Dion Dublin on 22 October. The draw for the second round was made live on BBC and BT by Mark Schwarzer and Glenn Murray on 12 November.

EFL Cup

On 15 June 2018, the draw for the first round was made in Vietnam.

EFL Trophy
On 13 July 2018, the initial group stage draw bar the U21 invited clubs was announced.

Transfers

Transfers in

Transfers out

Loans in

Loans out

References

Scunthorpe United
Scunthorpe United F.C. seasons